James or Jim Rhodes is the name of:
 James Rhodes (pianist) (born 1975), English-Spanish pianist
 James Rhodes, fictional comic book superhero also known as War Machine
 James Rhodes (Marvel Cinematic Universe), the film version of the character
 James Ford Rhodes (1848–1927), American historian and industrialist
 James Rhodes (cricketer) (1866–1939), English cricketer
 James Henry Rhodes (born 1930), print shop owner and political figure in British Columbia
 James Melvin Rhodes (1916–1976), American educational scientist
 James Rupert Rhodes, the comic-book superhero War Machine
 Jim Rhodes (1909–2001), American politician, governor of Ohio
 Jim Rhodes (developer) (born 1958), American real estate developer
 Jim Rhodes (golfer) (1946–2015), English golfer
 Dusty Rhodes (outfielder) (James Rhodes, 1927–2009), American baseball player

See also
 James A. Rhodes Arena, Akron, Ohio, United States
 James A. Rhodes State College, Lima, Allen County, Ohio, United States
 James Ford Rhodes High School, Cleveland, Ohio, United States